Beloved Corinna ( and also known as Corinna Darling) is a 1956 German drama film directed by Eduard von Borsody and starring Elisabeth Müller. It was shot at the Pichelsberg Studios in West Berlin. The art director Gabriel Pellon worked on the film's sets.

Cast
 Elisabeth Müller as Corinna Stephan
 Hans Söhnker as Peter Mansfeld
 Hannelore Schroth as Dagmar Mansfeld
 Alexander Kerst as Dr. Suter
 Valéry Inkijinoff as Chin
 Klaus Kinski as Klaus Brockmann
 Annie Rosar as Frau Suter
 Wolfgang Gruner as Inspzient am Theater
 Panos Papadopulos as Longo
 Gerhard Bünte as Professor Hansen
 Silja Lesny
 Sigurd Lohde
 Ah Yue Lou as Suka (as Ah-Yue Lou)
 Nadira

References

External links

1956 films
1956 drama films
German black-and-white films
Films directed by Eduard von Borsody
Films set in Hamburg
Films set in Malaysia
Films with screenplays by Ernst von Salomon
German drama films
1950s German-language films
West German films
Films based on German novels
1950s German films